Zasulauks is a neighbourhood of Riga, the capital of Latvia.

History 
The neighborhood was named after Heinrich von Zass.

References 

Neighbourhoods in Riga